Rashela Mizrahi is a Macedonian veterinarian and politician, who was the first Jewish minister of North Macedonia. A member of the VMRO-DPMNE party, she was dismissed in February 2020 after appearing with signs of the country's previous name (Macedonia). Mizrahi has reported facing antisemitic abuse and a hostile political environment since before taking office as the Labour and Social Policy Minister.

Early life 
Rasela Mizrahi was born on November 24, 1981 in Skopje, SFR Yugoslavia to Viktor and Liljana Mizrahi. She has a brother, Rahamim. Many of her family members were murdered in the Holocaust.

Mizrahi worked at SS. Cyril and Methodius University of Skopje from 2007 to 2009.

Dismissal 
Mizrahi caused controversy when she stood in front of a plaque with the country's former name, the Republic of Macedonia, instead of the Republic of North Macedonia. Minister of Foreign Affairs, Nikola Dimitrov, received a verbal note of protest from the Greek government. On February 15, 2020, the Assembly of North Macedonia voted to dismiss Mizrahi, with 62 votes for dismissal and 26 votes against.

Re-election 
In the parliamentary elections of June 2020, Mizrahi was again elected to the Assembly of North Macedonia. Among her responsibilities is the presidency of the North Macedonia - Israel Inter-Parliamentary Friendship Group.

References

Living people
Jewish politicians
Women government ministers of North Macedonia
Government ministers of North Macedonia
Macedonian Jews
Jewish women politicians
1981 births
People from Skopje